Club Patí Vilanova is a roller hockey team from Vilanova i la Geltrú, Catalonia. It was founded in 1951. In 2013–14 season, the male team finished in bottom place with zero points, thus being relegated to Primera División.

Trophies
Copa del Rey: 3
1964, 1968, 1976
CERS Cup: 1
2006–07
Catalan League: 2
1963–64, 1965–66

Season to season

Men's team

Women's team

External links
CP Vilanova Official Website

Catalan rink hockey clubs
Sports clubs established in 1951
1951 establishments in Spain